Christine Porter Marsh is an American politician and public school teacher from Arizona. She was elected to the state senate in 2020. A Democrat, she was first elected to represent district District 28, and later District 4, after redistricting.  She won by 497 votes (50.2%) against incumbent Kate Brophy McGee in an election with more than 120,000 votes cast. Marsh previously ran against Brophy McGee in 2018 and lost by 267 votes (49.9%).

Christine Marsh taught high school English at Chaparral High School for 27 years, before leaving to teach in the Cave Creek Unified School district for two years. In 2019 and she returned to Scottsdale Unified School District and in 2021 started her 30th year of teaching. In 2016, Marsh was named was Arizona's Teacher of the Year.

Marsh received undergraduate degree from the University of California Los Angeles after attending on a track scholarship. She received her Master's from the College of Education at Grand Canyon University. Marsh also has an honorary Doctorate of Humane Letters from Northern Arizona University.

References

External links 

 Profile at the Arizona Senate
 Campaign website

Women state legislators in Arizona
Democratic Party Arizona state senators
Politicians from Phoenix, Arizona
Schoolteachers from Arizona
Grand Canyon University alumni
21st-century American politicians
21st-century American women politicians
Year of birth missing (living people)
Living people